The Best Current Affairs Presenter is an award presented annually at the Star Awards, a ceremony that was established in 1994.

The category was introduced in 2010, at the 16th Star Awards ceremony. It was introduced as a result of the discontinuation of the Best News/Current Affairs Presenter award to create distinctions news and current affairs presenters.

The award is given in honour of a Mediacorp presenter who has delivered an outstanding performance in a current affairs programme. The nominees are determined by a team of judges employed by Mediacorp; winners are selected by a majority vote from the entire judging panel. Chun Guek Lay is the inaugural winner in this category for her performance in Focus.

Since its inception, the award has been given to three presenters. Chun and Tung Soo Hua are the most recent winners for their performances in Focus and Money Week respectively. Since the ceremony held in 2013, Chun is also the only presenter to win in this category three times, surpassing Tung who has two wins. Desmond Lim and Qi Qi hold the record for the most nominations without a win.

The award is currently being suspended and have not been presented since 2014 due to the lack of eligible nominees.

Recipients

 Each year is linked to the article about the Star Awards held that year.

Category facts

Most wins

References

External links 

Star Awards